Anthony Giacinto Tarasco (born December 9, 1970) is an American professional baseball outfielder and coach. He played in the major leagues for the Atlanta Braves, Montreal Expos, Baltimore Orioles, Cincinnati Reds, and New York Yankees between 1993 and 1999 and for the Mets in 2002. He also played with the Hanshin Tigers in the Japanese Central League in 2000.

Early life
Tarasco was born at Saint Vincent's Catholic Medical Center in Greenwich Village and, until he was 6 or 7 years old, lived in Washington Heights and the Bronx. His father, Jack, worked a summer job as a vendor at Yankee Stadium. At 13 years old, after moving to Santa Monica, California, Tarasco joined the Santa Monica Graveyard Crips, a set of the Crips street gang. At 16 years old, with the encouragement of fellow Crips members, he left the gang to focus on playing high school baseball.

Tarasco was selected by the Atlanta Braves in the 15th round of the 1988 Major League Baseball draft out of Santa Monica High School.

Professional career
Tarasco was traded along with Roberto Kelly and Esteban Yan from the Braves to the Expos for Marquis Grissom on April 6, 1995. As Montreal's starting right fielder, he hit .249 with 14 home runs, 40 runs batted in (RBI) and 24 stolen bases out of 27 attempts in 126 games with the Expos in 1995.

Originally expected to be the Expos' leadoff hitter entering the 1996 campaign, Tarasco was acquired by the Orioles from the Expos for Sherman Obando during spring training on March 13. The Orioles needed a left-handed-hitting reserve outfielder at the time. He was involved in a controversial play in the 1996 American League Championship Series while playing right field for the Baltimore Orioles.  While fielding a fly ball hit by New York Yankees shortstop Derek Jeter,  12-year-old fan Jeffrey Maier reached over the fence and tried to catch the ball but instead deflected it into the stands.  The umpires called a  home run, although the correct call would have been fan interference. The play was the turning point in the series, which the Yankees won. Tarasco was claimed off waivers by the Reds from the Orioles on March 24, 1998. He had requested not to be demoted to the Rochester Red Wings.

Tarasco spent the remainder of his career as a part time player, often shuttling between the major and minor leagues.  Tarasco and Jeter were teammates for a short time during the 1999 season.

In June 2002, Tarasco's New York Mets teammate Mark Corey suffered a seizure after the two players smoked marijuana outside of Shea Stadium. Under Major League Baseball drug policy at the time, because both players were first-time offenders, they were not subject to discipline from the league.

Coaching career

Washington Nationals
Tarasco began working for the Washington Nationals in or around 2005. For a time, Tarasco was the minor league coordinator for the Nationals. On November 14, 2012, the Nationals announced that Tarasco would join their coaching staff in the 2013 season to coach first base and outfield. Tarasco served as first base coach for the Nationals through the 2015 season. On October 5, 2015, the entire Nationals coaching staff, including Tarasco, were fired after a disappointing 2015 season.

New York Mets
On December 30, 2020, Tarasco was hired to be the first base coach for the New York Mets replacing Tony DeFrancesco.

References

External links
, or Retrosheet
Pelota Binaria (Venezuelan Winter League)

1970 births
Living people
African-American baseball players
Baseball coaches from New York (state)
American expatriate baseball players in Canada
American expatriate baseball players in Japan
Atlanta Braves players
Baltimore Orioles players
Cardenales de Lara players
American expatriate baseball players in Venezuela
Cincinnati Reds players
Columbus Clippers players
Durham Bulls players
Frederick Keys players
Greenville Braves players
Gulf Coast Braves players
Gulf Coast Orioles players
Hanshin Tigers players
Idaho Falls Braves players
Indianapolis Indians players
Major League Baseball right fielders
Montreal Expos players
New York Mets players
New York Yankees players
Nippon Professional Baseball outfielders
Norfolk Tides players
Pulaski Braves players
Richmond Braves players
Rochester Red Wings players
Baseball players from Atlanta
Baseball players from New York City
St. Lucie Mets players
Sumter Braves players
Washington Nationals coaches
New York Mets coaches
21st-century African-American sportspeople
20th-century African-American sportspeople
Crips